Highlands Historic District may refer to:

 Original Highlands, Louisville, Kentucky, listed as Highlands Historic District on the NRHP in Kentucky
Highlands Historic District (Fall River, Massachusetts), listed on the NRHP in Massachusetts
 Highlands Historic District (Meridian, Mississippi), listed on the NRHP in Mississippi
Highlands Historic District (Moose, Wyoming), listed on the NRHP in Wyoming

See also
Highland Historic District (disambiguation)